Kevin Birch is a former association football player who represented New Zealand at international level.

In 1982, Birch played as a guest player for the victorious Taranaki XI against the touring AFC Bournemouth at Pukekura Park.

Birch made his full All Whites debut in a 6–1 win over Malaysia on 3 April 1984 and ended his international playing career with 9 A-international caps to his credit, his final cap a substitute appearance in a 2–0 win over Fiji on 7 June 1985.

References

External links
 

1961 births
Living people
Manurewa AFC players
Gisborne City AFC players
New Zealand association footballers
New Zealand international footballers
Association football defenders